John E. King (1870-1938) and Homer D. King (1897-1961) were father-and-son publishers of the newspaper Hemet News in Riverside County, California, between 1912 and 1961.

John E. King

Personal 

John Emanuel King was born August 27, 1870 in Laketon, Wabash County, Indiana, to Daniel J. and Mary M. Grisso King. He had a sister, Alice. He was married in 1895 to Georgia Duncan, and they had a son, Homer D. (below), and a daughter, Florence Helen. His death on November 26, 1938, was attributed to a "chronic heart and kidney disorder, aggravated by pneumonia."<ref>"Widow of Riverside County Publisher Dies," San Bernardino County Sun," November 21, 1946, page 13]</ref>"Half Century of Newspaper Life Comes to Close," "Hemet News," December 2, 1938, page 1

 Career 
At the age of 11 John E. King became a printer's apprentice in Laketon, Indiana.  Seven years later in 1888, he established a newspaper, the Leader in Larchwood, Iowa, and in 1890 he became part owner of the Review newspaper in Rock Rapids, Iowa.

From there, he went to Minnesota and founded the Adrian Democrat.  From 1901 to 1911, John F. King owned and edited the Gazette in Red Lake Falls, Minnesota, followed by the Daily Sentinel in Missoula, Montana.
 
In Minnesota, he was postmaster in the town of Adrian and was a member of the state Board of Equalization for two years. He was state librarian of Minnesota from 1905 to 1911 and president of the National Association of State Librarians from 1908 to 1911.
From 1894 to 1896 he was president of the Southwest Minnesota Editorial Association, and in 1904 he was candidate for Minnesota's secretary of state. In 1908 he was secretary of Governor John A. Johnson's presidential campaign committee, headquartered in Chicago.

In 1912, King purchased half the ownership of the Hemet News, and he moved to that community in Riverside County, California, to take over the publication of the newspaper. Besides his newspaper and banking work in Hemet, King was postmaster there from 1915 to 1924 and president of the library board from 1918 to 1924. He also was a director of the chamber of commerce, and he helped found the Ramona Pageant in Hemet.  He was a president of the California Newspaper Publishers Association. He was a member of the Knights of Pythias and of San Bernardino Lodge, Benevolent and Protective Order of Elks.

In 1925 he was appointed by Governor Friend Richardson as state printer, and he served three years. In 1927 and 1928, he was a member of the California State Board of Education. In 1932 he was a Presidential elector.

John E. King was also a banker, being a receiver for the San Bernardino, Rialto and Victorville National banks.

Homer D. King

Homer Duncan King, who was born in 1897, began his journalism career as a young man, first on the Hemet News, then the Redlands Daily Facts and the San Bernardino Sun-Telegram before becoming managing editor of the Nevada State Journal and finally of the Hollywood Citizen-News."Career Ends," Long Beach Independent, February 22, 1961, page 2 He held all those positions before he was age 30."Editor Homer King Dies," Chula Vista Star-News, February 26, 1961, page 2

Homer King and his sister, Helen, a schoolteacher, were both afflicted with muscular dystrophy.

While King was working at the Citizen-News "a creeping paralysis first manifested itself," according to King's obituary in the Long Beach Independent. "A physician prescribed that he should be placed in a cast for two years." Instead, in 1926, he returned to Hemet and took over operation of the family's newspaper.

The disease was progressive. At first he could walk with a cane, and he rode a bicycle. Then, after a bad fall, he drove a specially equipped car, hobbling into his office on crutches. Later, he had to be carried into the office.

The Los Angeles Times wrote that he was "an editor and writer of great physical and professional courage" who had for twenty years "been carried each day into his office, seated in a chair, a cigar placed in his mouth and a pencil in his hand. . . . He could roll the cigar from one side of his mouth to the other," and he could sign his name "if the paper were passed beneath his hand," but he was "capable of no other movement."

Columnist Earl E. Buie recalled in the San Bernardino County Sun'' on February 22, 1961, that King had for twenty years been "unable to move any part of his body," but "his faithful companion, Johnny McCloy, a male nurse, [was constantly at his side." McCloy "picked him up as you would a child, carried him to his car, then to his desk in his office, propped him against a stack of pillows in his chair, from which he dictated news stories, editorials and a sparkling column of philosophy, humor, comment on the events of the day and observations."

Buie wrote that McCloy "kept Homer's cigars fired, his hair combed, put on his hat in a jaunty position, and, when Homer took a night out with the boys, he held his cards and shoved out the chips at the poker table."

King died in his sleep on February 21, 1961. Survivors included his widow, Agnes, and a stepdaughter from a previous marriage, Alice Benham of Los Angeles. Burial was in the family plot in San Jacinto Valley Cemetery.

References

American newspaper publishers (people)